Fernando Sulichin is an Argentine film and documentary maker. He has produced over 25 films and documentaries.  Since 2003 Sulichin has worked on a number of documentaries with the director and producer Oliver Stone including ones about living public figures Edward Snowden, Fidel Castro and Hugo Chavez.

Early life 
Sulichin was born in Buenos Aires, Argentina and moved to the United States in the late 1980s to study architecture at UCLA. While studying he became interested in the film industry and never completed his architecture studies.

Career 
Sulichin was the associate producer of the 1992 film Malcolm X, directed by Spike Lee. He is credited with securing permission for the film crew to enter Mecca and for getting Nelson Mandela to perform a cameo role in the film.

Sulichin is the founder of two production companies, Central Films and New Element Media, which have produced a number of films such as Sundance Prize Winner “Love Liza“ (2003) by Todd Louiso and Mary (2004) by Abel Ferrara, winner at Venice Film Festival.

In addition to fictional films, Sulichin has produced documentaries and films about high-profile living individuals, partnering with Oliver Stone to make films on Vladimir Putin, Fidel Castro, Hugo Chavez, and Snowden.

In 2016, it was reported that Sulichin accompanied actors Sean Penn and Kate del Castillo on their secret meeting with El Chapo in his hideout in the mountains of Durango prior to his arrest. The now famous meeting was purportedly to discuss the prospect of making a movie about the Sinaloa cartel leader.  However, the Mexican authorities later insinuated that tracking the group's visit aided them in arresting El Chapo arrest three months later. This led to speculation that the group may have been working with the US and Mexican authorities to locate one of the most wanted criminals and notorious drug lords. Both Penn and del Castillo have said that they have feared for their lives since the ill-fated meeting.

Philanthropy 

He is a founding and life-time member of the Nelson Mandela Children's Fund, having met Mandela through filming Malcolm X in 1992.  

He sits on the board of CORE (formerly J/P Haitian Relief Organization), American actor Sean Penn's foundation that was initially established to deliver humanitarian relief during the Haitian disaster in January 2010. In 2017, he received the Garry Shandling Humanitarian Award alongside Sean Penn for their Haitan relief work.

He is reported to support the David Lynch Foundation, a charitable foundation set up by the film director of the same name that focuses on alleviating mental health problems and healing trauma.

In addition to humanitarian causes, Sulichin has been involved in raising awareness about environmental issues and climate change, for which he received the National Order of the Légion d'honneur in 2015.

In June 2019, Sulichin spoke at the Peace to Prosperity workshop in Bahrain. Sulichin sat on a panel with the head of the international football federation (FIFA) Gianni Infantino and the pair discussed the role that entertainment and sport could play in brokering peace in the Middle East.

Honours and awards 

 2015 Chevalier (knight) de Légion d'Honneur, France.

In 2018, Sulichin was awarded The Sheikh Abdullah Award for Intercultural Dialogue at the No2H8 Crime Awards 2018.

Filmography

References

External links
 

Living people
Year of birth missing (living people)
Argentine film producers